Euphyllia paradivisa, or branching frogspawn coral, is a species of large-polyped stony coral belonging to the Euphylliidae family. It shares the common name of "frogspawn coral" with Euphyllia divisa, but is differentiated as the "branching" frogspawn whereas Euphyllia divisa has a "wall" structure. It is a commonly kept species in the marine aquarium hobby.

Euphyllia paradivisa is considered a vulnerable species by the IUCN Red List. It is threatened by many of the environmental issues with coral reefs such as increased sea surface temperature, ocean acidification, and overfishing for the marine aquarium trade. The National Oceanic and Atmospheric Administration has stated there is "a risk of extinction within the foreseeable future for Euphyllia paradivisa."

Description
Colonies of Euphyllia paradivisa are made up of branching, separate corallites. Polyps have branching tentacles. Color is pale greenish-grey or pink (in rare instances) with lighter tentacle tips. Euphyllia paradivisa displays fluorescence when the chromatophores of its zooxanthellae and the coral host pigments are excited by blue-dominated light.

Distribution & habitat
It is native to the Indo-Pacific islands, distributed mostly in the Coral Triangle area, and also found in the American Samoa. It prefers environments protected from surface wave action on fringing reef crests, mid-slope terraces, and lagoons at depths of 2 to 25 meters (6–82 ft).

References

Euphylliidae
Animals described in 1990